Toomas Paur (born 17 March 1949 in Võru) is an Estonian politician. He was a member of XIII Riigikogu.

He has been a member of Estonian Centre Party.

References

Living people
1949 births
Estonian Centre Party politicians
Members of the Riigikogu, 2015–2019
Estonian University of Life Sciences alumni
People from Võru